The Christchurch Polytechnic Institute of Technology (CPIT), formerly the Christchurch Technical College, was an institute of technology in Christchurch, New Zealand. It merged with Aoraki Polytechnic and became Ara Institute of Canterbury in 2016.

CPIT provided full-time and part-time education in technologies and trades. It was the largest polytechnic and institute of technology in the South Island (25,000 students) and one of the leading institutions of its kind in the country.

In New Zealand's ranking, the Performance Based Research Fund, based on the scientific output of all employees, CPIT ranked 4th among all institutes of technologies in New Zealand. It offered a comprehensive range of programmes, which covered almost all subject areas. CPIT specialised in Music Arts, Visual Art & Design, Nursing, Applied Management (Business), Engineering, Applied Science, Education, Information Technology, and Architecture. CPIT hosted New Zealand's only school for radio journalism and communication, the New Zealand School of Broadcasting. It had a student population from more than 50 countries.

Campus
CPIT had a centrally located campus within the CBD on Madras Street (Madras Street Campus) just to the south of Cathedral Square in Christchurch, New Zealand. The city campus was located five minutes walk from the city centre. The majority of programmes were taught here. CPIT's Sullivan Avenue campus (CPIT Trades Campus) was on the corner of Sullivan Avenue and Ensors Road Opawa, in southeast Christchurch.

Alumni 

 Jennine Bailey – jazz singer, university music teacher
 Ben Boyce – television personality
Denise Copland – artist 
Corin Dann – broadcaster 
Guy 'Dcypher' Ellis – graffiti artist
Naomi Ferguson – singer, actor, composer, teacher 
Amelia Gain – entrepreneur 
Clarke Gayford – broadcaster, partner of Jacinda Ardern, 40th Prime Minister of New Zealand
Polly Harding – broadcaster
Sam Harrison – artist and sculptor
Miriama Kamo – journalist, children's author and television presenter
Euan Macleod – artist
Tim Main – artist, designer, sculptor
Megan Mansell – broadcaster
Mei Heron – journalist
Mike McRoberts – broadcaster
Fiona Pears – violinist, composer 
Oliver Perkins – artist 
Chris Reddington – sculptor, composer, musician
Ben Reid – printmaker 
Rebecca Smallridge – artist
Bevan Smith – chef
Deon Swiggs – politician
Jack Tame – broadcaster
Sam Wills – performing artist
Wongi "Freak" Wilson – graffiti artist

References

External links

 Christchurch Polytechnic Institute of Technology website

Educational institutions established in 1906
Buildings and structures in Christchurch
Education in Christchurch
Organisations based in Christchurch
Vocational education in New Zealand
Christchurch Central City
1906 establishments in New Zealand
Universities and colleges in New Zealand